Gudhem is a locality situated in Falköping Municipality, Västra Götaland County, Sweden. It had 427 inhabitants in 2010.

Gudhem Hundred, or Gudhems härad, was a hundred of Västergötland in Sweden.

Gudhem Abbey, initially a Benedictine and later Cistercian nunnery, operated in Gudhem between the 12th and 16th centuries.

References 

Populated places in Västra Götaland County
Populated places in Falköping Municipality